The Bobbsey Twins are the principal characters of what was, for 75 years, the Stratemeyer Syndicate's longest-running series of American children's novels, written under the pseudonym Laura Lee Hope. The first of 72 books was published in 1904, the last in 1979, with a separate series of 30 books published from 1987 through 1992.  The books related the adventures of the children of the upper-middle-class Bobbsey family, which included two sets of fraternal twins: Nan and Bert, who were twelve years old, and Flossie and Freddie, who were six.

Authorship

Edward Stratemeyer is believed to be the writer of the first volume in its original form in 1904. When the original series was brought to its conclusion in 1979, it reached a total of 72 volumes. At least two attempts to restart the series were launched after this, but neither effort saw the popularity the original series achieved.

Speculation that Stratemeyer also wrote the second and third volumes of the series is believed to be incorrect; these books are attributed to Lilian Garis, wife of Howard Garis, credited with volumes 4–28 and 41. Elizabeth Ward is credited with volumes 29–35, while Harriet Stratemeyer Adams is credited with 36–38, 39 (with Camilla McClave), 40, 42, 43 (with Andrew Svenson), and 44–48. Volumes 49–52 are attributed to Andrew Svenson, while 53–59, and the 1960s rewrites of 1–4, 7, 11–13, and 17, are attributed to June Dunn. Grace Grote is regarded as the author of 60–67 and the rewrites of 14 and 18–20, and Nancy Axelrad is credited with 68–72. Of the 1960s rewrites not mentioned, volumes 5 and 16 are credited to Mary Donahoe, 6 and 25 to Patricia Doll, 8–10 and 15 to Bonnibel Weston, and 24 to Margery Howard.

Main characters

 Mr. Richard Bobbsey, the owner of a lumber yard in Lakeport
 Mrs. Mary Bobbsey, his wife, a stay-at-home mom
 Nan Bobbsey, their elder daughter, Bert's twin. She has dark hair and dark eyes.
 Bert Bobbsey, their elder son, Nan's twin. He has dark hair and dark eyes.
 Freddie Bobbsey, their younger son, Flossie's twin. He has blond hair and blue eyes.
 Flossie Bobbsey, their younger daughter, Freddie's twin
 Dinah Johnson, the Bobbseys' cook, Sam's wife
 Sam Johnson, the Bobbseys' handyman, Dinah's husband
 Snoop, the Bobbseys' cat. (Snoop starts as a male cat, but is incorrectly changed to "she" after being lost to a circus in the fourth volume of the series.)
 Downy, the Bobbseys' duck
 Snap, the Bobbseys' dog
 Waggo, the Bobbseys' other dog
 Danny Rugg, the school bully 
 Charlie Mason, Bert's friend
 Nellie Parks, Nan's friend
 Grace Lavine, Nan's friend

Plots

In the original editions, the first books in the series (like those in previous Stratemeyer series) took place in a clear chronology, with the characters aging as time passed. The Bobbsey Twins: Merry Days Indoors and Out took place over the course of a school year, with Nan and Bert described as eight years old and Freddie and Flossie four. The second book, The Bobbsey Twins in the Country is set at the beginning of the following summer. The second part of the summer is chronicled in The Bobbsey Twins at the Seashore, which is written as a direct sequel to the previous book, tying up some plot threads. The fourth book, The Bobbsey Twins at School, begins the next autumn, with Nan and Bert "nearly nine years old" and Freddie and Flossie "almost five." Editors at the Stratemeyer Syndicate quickly realized, at this rate, their young heroes would quickly age beyond their readership, so the later books in the series (and revised editions) take place in a sort of chronological stasis, with the older twins perpetually 12 years old and the younger set 6.

The earliest Bobbsey books were mainly episodic strings of adventures; with the growing popularity of the Hardy Boys and Nancy Drew, detective plots began to dominate the series. Few of the mysteries involved violent crime, and quite a few did not involve any crime.

While many of the early volumes were constructed from whole cloth, with little or no connection to the real world, by 1917 (The Bobbsey Twins in a Great City, vol. 9, rewritten in 1960 as The Bobbsey Twins' Search in the Great City) they visit real places, and by the 1950s (The Bobbsey Twins at Pilgrim Rock vol. 50), those visits to real places were as well-researched as any fictional visits to real places. By 1971, when the Bobbseys visited Colonial Williamsburg (The Bobbsey Twins' Red White and Blue Mystery, vol. 64), real places were depicted in meticulous detail, down to the names of well-known hotels and restaurants (and, in that particular case, the color of Colonial Williamsburg shuttle buses).

It is said vol. 68, The Bobbsey Twins on the Sun-Moon Cruise, was the result of a research trip for a proposed Nancy Drew book: Harriet Stratemeyer Adams and Nancy Axelrad (her personal assistant at the time) took an eclipse cruise but, when they returned, the publisher was more interested in a new Bobbsey title.

Post-1960 rewrites
In 1960, the Stratemeyer syndicate rewrote most of the older volumes, many of which became almost unrecognizable in the process. This was concurrent with the release of a new edition of the series, with picture covers, no dust jackets, and a lavender spine and back cover (replacing earlier various green bindings). Many of the cover paintings were dust-jacket paintings added in the 1950s (for earlier versions, a single common dust-jacket painting was used throughout an edition), but most were new with the "purple" edition. In all, twenty were completely rewritten, all but two with modernized titles, while sixteen were never released in this edition, evidently deemed to be dated beyond repair.

Most of the rewrites were motivated by changing technology (automobiles replacing horses and buggies) or changing social standards, particularly in how Sam and Dinah, the black cook and handyman, were portrayed. The Bobbsey Twins and Baby May received the most extreme rewrite; it is a story about the Bobbsey family's adventures searching for the parents of a foundling baby. Since, by the 1960s, sheer numbers of government agencies rendered the original story utterly implausible, an entirely new novel was written about the twins' adventures with a baseball-playing baby elephant (The Bobbsey Twins' Adventures with Baby May). This, however, had a ripple effect, because the original The Bobbsey Twins at Cloverbank was a sequel to the original Baby May. Thus, a second book, The Bobbsey Twins and the Four-Leaf Clover Mystery, was written. It incorporates little material from the original.

New Bobbsey Twins
Starting in 1987, a numbered series of paperback originals branded The New Bobbsey Twins were released by Minstrel Books, an imprint of Pocket Books. Featuring all-new stories, the series ended with volume 30, The Mystery of the Mixed-Up Mall, in 1992.

Analysis
In her book The Rhetoric of Character in Children's Literature, Maria Nikolajeva refers to the twins as a "simple duplication of protagonists".  Bobbie Ann Mason, in The Girl Sleuth:  A Feminist Guide, differs, agreeing the books afford the child-reader an opportunity to imagine "a union with someone just like her, but of the opposite sex", but arguing the distinction between boy-twin and girl-twin "makes a world of difference":  Bert "acts out his manhood by winning contests and beating the town bully, Danny Rugg", while his twin Nan – throughout the series "too old for dolls and pranks, too young for boys and barred from their games" – spends most of her time in the books "wagging her finger at Freddie and appearing to enjoy it", acting as "mini-parent, non-child, serious-minded little manipulator".

List of 72 original books and rewrites

From Weinstein's Bobbsey Twins Bibliography (list last revised September 18, 1999)

In other media 
Re-imagined versions of the Bobbsey twins appear in The CW drama Nancy Drew, an adaptation of another Stratemeyer Syndicate series. In the series, the twins are given the full names of Amanda and Gilbert "Gil" and are respectively played by Aadila Dosani and Praneet Akilla.

References

Relevant literature
Cohen, Sol. "Minority Stereotypes in Children's Literature: The Bobbsey Twins, 1904–1968." In The Educational Forum vol. 34, no. 1, pp. 119–125. Taylor & Francis Group, 1969.
Johnson, Deidre. "Keeping modern amid changing times: The bobbsey twins—1904, 1950, 1961." Book Research Quarterly 6, no. 4 (1990): 31–42.

External links

 The Bobbsey Twins' Page by Michael P. Weinstein, including a list of All 72 Original Bobbsey Twins Books and their Revisions, a General Commentary on the series as a whole, and the Writers of the Bobbsey Twins
 
 
 Keeline, James, D. "Bobbsey Twins Formats" (2000)
 A webpage for Bobbsey Twins collectors with format information, other Bobbsey Twins items, original artwork information, and information on other series written under the same pseudonym (2016)

1904 American novels
Book series introduced in 1904
Characters in American novels
Child characters in literature
Fictional twins
Juvenile series
Stratemeyer Syndicate
Works published under a pseudonym